Air Service Command Mediterranean Theater of Operations was a United States Army Air Forces logistics organization. It had its headquarters and an HQ squadron at Naples, Italy.  It was originally XII Air Force Service Command, part of Twelfth Air Force, but after 1 January 1944 became AAF Service Command, Mediterranean Theater of Operations. The unit was assigned directly to Army Air Forces, Mediterranean Theater of Operations, and controlled the Air Depots and Sub Depots in the Mediterranean Theater of Operations. 
 
The command provided theater logistics at the end of the war (a detachment was at Foggia, Italy), and subordinate units included the 302nd Depot Repair Squadron.

Lineage
 Constituted as XII Air Force Service Command
 Activated on 22 August 1942
 Redesignated Air Service Command, Mediterranean Theater of Operations on 1 January 1944
 Disbanded on 30 November 1945

Assignments
 Twelfth Air Force, 22 August 1942 (attached to VIII Air Force Service Command September 1942 – ca. December 1942, Northwest African Air Service Command February 1943 – March 1943)
 Army Air Forces, Mediterranean Theater of Operations, 1 January 1944 – October 1945 (attached to Mediterranean Allied Air Forces 1 January 1944 – unknown
 Unknown Oct 1945 – 30 November 1945

Stations
 MacDill Field, Florida 22 August 1942 – September 1942
 Kew Gardens, London, United Kingdom, September 1942 – November 1942
 Oran, Algeria, December 1942
 Algiers, Algeria, ca. December 1942
 Maison Blanche Airfield, Algeria, ca. March 1943
 Naples, Italy, February 1944 – 30 November 1945

Components
Included:

Commands
 Casablanca Service Area Command (Provisional) (later 1st Service Area Command (Provisional)), 12 December 1942 – ca. 14 March 1943
 Constantine Service Area Command (Provisional) (later 3d Service Area Command (Provisional)), 14 December 1942 – 14 March 1943
 Oran Service Area Command (Provisional) (later 2d Service Area Command (Provisional)), 12 December 1942 – ca. 14 March 1943
 I Service Area Command (later I Air Service Area Command (Special)), ca. 14 March 1943 – 30 September 1945
 II Service Area Command (later II Air Service Area Command (Special), XV Air Force Service Command), ca. 14 March 1943 – December 1943, January 1944 – 9 September 1945 (detached to Strategic Air Force, Mediterranean Allied Air Forces January 1944 – spring 1945)
 III Service Area Command (later III Air Service Area Command (Special), XII Air Force Service Command), 14 March 1943 – 25 July 1945 (detached to Tactical Air Force, Mediterranean Allied Air Forces January 1944 – spring 1945)

Areas
 Advanced Air Depot Area, October 1943 – December 1943

Depots
 Adriatic Base Depot, unknown
 Air Force General Depot No. 1 (later Oran Intransit Depot, Air Force Sub Depot No. 12), Nov 42 – ca 1 May 1945
 Air Force General Depot No. 2 (later Maison Blanche General Depot, Air Force General Depot No. 4), Nov 42 – 17 October 1944
 Air Force General Depot No. 3 (later Casablanca Sub Depot, Air Force Sub Depot No. 11, Air Force General Depot No. 11), Feb 43 – 21 August 1944
 Air Force General Depot No. 4 (later Air Force General Depot No. 2), Jan 43 – 29 November 1944
 Air Force General Depot No. 5 (later Air Force General Depot No. 1), May 43 – 29 November 1944
 Air Force General Depot No. 6 (later Air Force General Depot No. 3, Air Force Sub Depot No. 31), Aug 43 – 14 July 1944, 19 September 1944 – ca. 31 July 1945
 51st Troop Carrier Wing, 15–31 August 1945

See also
List of service commands of the United States Army Air Forces

Notes

References

Intermediate service commands of the United States Army Air Forces
Military units and formations established in 1942
Military units and formations disestablished in 1945